The Jinhui dialect, also known as Dônđäc, is a dialect of Wu Chinese spoken in the town of , China in Shanghai's suburban Fengxian District. It has about 100,000 native speakers. Jinhui is located near the border of the ancient states of Wu and Yue during the Spring and Autumn period. Like other Wu dialects, Dônđäc has preserved many special features of the Old Yue language.

Dônđäc has 20 oral vowel qualities, plus many nasal and rhotic ones. According to a Fudan University study that was published in the journal Science, Dônđäc has the largest oral vowel quality inventory in the world (phonemically speaking), and ranks highest in overall phonemic diversity among all languages studied in the research. According to linguist Qian Nairong, who spent eight years teaching in Fengxian and studying its dialects, the reason Dônđäc has so many vowels is because Jinhui is the place where five isoglosses intersect.

Phonology
Jinhui has 20 oral vowel phonemes, compared with 2 in Standard Mandarin. Pairs of checked and non-checked finals have different vowels. These differences are meaningful in distinguishing phonemes, therefore they are considered different vowels.

There is also a rhotic vowel  which also occurs in restricted environments and is not argued to be a separate vowel, as well as syllabic nasals . There are no diphthongs in Jinhui; all vowels are monophthongs.

Jinhui also has a large number of consonants, including glottalized stops and a palatalized series:

The glottalized consonants are unique to the Jinhui dialect and neighboring areas.

 are phonetically unusual for a Chinese variety; these and the palatalized series correspond to the Mandarin medial vowels -u- and -i-.

It is not clear how many phonemic tones Jinhui has. Of the eight traditional tones, one pair is found in checked syllables, and so not phonemically distinctive. All four pairs may depend on the voicing of the initial, as in other varieties of Wu, but the existence of  suggests either that they are distinctive after sonorants, or that the consonant inventory is larger.

There is also a 'light' (unstressed) tone,  2.

Education
In an effort to preserve its unique dialect, Jinhui began teaching it in school in 2012, with a textbook written by Fudan University professor Li Hui, a Jinhui native, and Hong Yulong, the principal of Jinhui School.

References

Culture in Shanghai
Wu Chinese